Briceni is a city in northern Moldova. It is the seat of Briceni District.

Demographics
At the 2004 census, the city had a population of 8,765. At the 1930 census, there were two localities: Briceni Târg (literally Briceni Fair), and Briceni Sat (literally Briceni village), and at the time they were part of Plasa Briceni of Hotin County.

Etymology
The town has been also called: Berchan, Bricheni, Bricheni Târg, Bricheni Sat, Britchan, Britchani, Britsiteni.

Jewish community

The Jewish cemetery of Briceni contains some 3,250 remaining tombstones though it is heavily overgrown and many are illegible. It is located in the eastern vicinities of the town, left of the road R11 leading to Ocnița.

History
On 5 December 2022, during a Russian bombing campaign against Ukraine during the 2022 Russian invasion of Ukraine, a missile fell within the borders of Moldova into an orchard near Briceni. This was only the second such incident in Moldova, as previously a Russian rocket had fallen into the village of Naslavcea. Later, on 14 January 2023, another missile fell into the village of Larga.

Media
 Radio Chișinău 102,6 FM

International relations

Twin Towns – Sister Cities
Briceni is twinned with:
  Rădăuți, Romania

References

2004 Moldovan Census
1930 Romanian census

External links 

 briceni.com
 rich.md
 briceni.at.ua
 briceni.md
 'Jewish Cemetery'

Cities and towns in Moldova
Ukrainian diaspora in Europe
Khotinsky Uyezd
Hotin County
Ținutul Suceava
Shtetls
Holocaust locations in Moldova
Massacres in Moldova
Briceni District